1,3,5-Triazine, also called s-triazine, is an organic chemical compound with the formula (HCN).  It is a six-membered heterocyclic aromatic ring, one of several isomeric triazines.  S-triazine—the "symmetric" isomer—and its derivatives are useful in a variety of applications.

Preparation
Symmetrical 1,3,5-triazines are prepared by trimerization of certain nitriles such as cyanogen chloride or cyanimide. Benzoguanamine (with one phenyl and 2 amino substituents) is synthesised from benzonitrile and dicyandiamide. In the Pinner triazine synthesis  (named after Adolf Pinner) the reactants are an alkyl or aryl amidine and phosgene. Insertion of an N-H moiety into a hydrazide by a copper carbenoid, followed by treatment with ammonium chloride also gives the triazine core.

Amine-substituted triazines called Guanamines are prepared by the condensation of cyanoguanidine with the corresponding nitrile:
(HN)C=NCN  +  RCN   →  (CNH)(CR)N

Applications
As a reagent in organic synthesis, s-triazine is used as the equivalent of hydrogen cyanide (HCN).  Being a solid (vs a gas for HCN), triazine is sometimes easier to handle in the laboratory.  One application is in the Gattermann reaction, used to attach the formyl group to aromatic substrates.

Triazine derivatives
N- and C-substituted triazines are used industrially. The most common derivative of 1,3,5-triazine is 1,3,5-triazine-2,4,6-triamine, commonly known as melamine or cyanuramide. Another important derivative is 1,3,5-triazine-2,4,6-triol better known as cyanuric acid.

Cyanuric chloride (2,4,6-trichloro-1,3,5-triazine) is the starting point for the manufacture of many herbicides such as Simazine and atrazine. Chlorinated triazines are the basis of an important family of reactive dyes, which are covalently attached to cellulosic materials.

Triazines are also found in pharmaceutical products.

References

Triazines
Nitrogen heterocycles
Heterocyclic compounds with 1 ring